Julius Spokely (May 27, 1877 – August 12, 1954) was an American businessman and politician.

Spokely was born un Polk County, Minnesota and lived in Crookston, Minnesota. He was a land owner and operator. Spokely served as sheriff of Polk County. He also served in the Minnesota Senate from 1947 to 1950.

References

1877 births
1954 deaths
People from Crookston, Minnesota
Businesspeople from Minnesota
Minnesota sheriffs
Minnesota state senators